"Find the Time" is a 1986 single by the British pop group Five Star. It was the second single to be taken from their million-plus selling second album, Silk & Steel, and peaked at #7 in the UK in July 1986.

The single was written by Nick Trevisick and Paul Gurvitz who had written the single "R.S.V.P." for the band the previous year.

The video features the band performing a dance routine alongside the River Thames and the Houses of Parliament in London.

The song was also featured on the soundtrack of the video game Grand Theft Auto: Episodes from Liberty City on the fictional in-game station "Vice City FM".

Track listings
7" single and picture disc:
 "Find the Time" (Single Version) 3:58
 "Sky"

12" single: PT40800
 "Find the Time" (Midnight Mix) (Phil Harding PWL Mix) 6:59  
 "Find the Time" (Dub) (Phil Harding PWL Mix) *
 "Sky"
 "Find the Time" (Single Version)

2nd 12" single: PT40800R
 "Find the Time" (Shep Pettibone Remix–Part One) 6:16
 "Find the Time" (Shep Pettibone Remix–Part Two) aka (Dub Mix) on Disc 9 of 'Luxury - The Definitive Anthology 1984-1991 "Sky" 
 "Find the Time" (Midnight Mix) (Phil Harding PWL Mix) 6:59

All tracks available on the remastered versions of either the 2010 'Silk & Steel' album, the 2013 'The Remix Anthology (The Remixes 1984-1991)' or the 2018 'Luxury - The Definitive Anthology 1984-1991' boxset EXCEPT *' "Find The Time" (Dub) - only available on vinyl

Five Star songs
1986 singles
Songs written by Paul Gurvitz
Songs written by Nick Trevisick
Song recordings produced by Richard James Burgess
1986 songs